Obiaruku is an Ukwuani town in Delta State, Nigeria.It was  founded by the people of Eziokpor and Umuebu origin in Delta State. Obiaruku is the headquarter of Ukwuani Local Government Area (LGA), Delta State, Nigeria. It is one of the major homeland of the Ukwuani speaking(akashiada) people. The Okpala-Uku of Obiaruku is the oldest male in the town. Obiaruku is made of several communities and sub communities called Quarters which includes Okuzu, Umusume, Ogbeaka, Ogwezi etc. Each community or Quarter has an Okpala-Uku who is the oldest male as the traditional head of the community. The Okpala-Uku has his cabinet made up of Chiefs ( Inotu)  including the Onotu-Uku(traditional prime minister), Ugo (Speaker), Onueze etc.  There’s a general assembly of traditional rulers with the oldest Okpala-uku as the Okpala-Uku General.

References

Populated places in Delta State